Gala Site is a historic archaeological site located near Gala, Botetourt County, Virginia. The site was occupied by Native Americans from circa 3000-1000 B.C. to ca. 900–1607. Archaeological resources at the site include intact remains ranging in function from mortuary to architectural to subsistence as well as community refuse. The site has the potential to provide scholars invaluable information about Native American funerary practices, settlement patterns, ethnic diversity, and other information about the people who inhabited the upper James River portion of southwestern Virginia.

It was listed on the National Register of Historic Places in 2010.

References

Archaeological sites on the National Register of Historic Places in Virginia
National Register of Historic Places in Botetourt County, Virginia